The Oglala National Grassland is a United States National Grassland in the northwest corner of Nebraska. It is in northern Sioux and northwestern Dawes counties, on the borders with South Dakota and Wyoming. It is managed by the U.S. Forest Service together with the Nebraska and Samuel R. McKelvie National Forests and the Buffalo Gap and Fort Pierre National Grasslands from common offices in Chadron, Nebraska.

Attractions
Oglala National Grassland is home to some of the most striking badlands formations in Toadstool Geologic Park, near Crawford, Nebraska and Whitney, Nebraska.

The Hudson-Meng Bison Kill, also located on the grassland, is an archaeological excavation in progress.

The Warbonnet Battlefield Monument, commemorating the 1876 Battle of Warbonnet Creek, is located on Oglala National Grassland on Montrose Road.

The grassland also contains the Agate, Bordgate, and Rock Bass reservoirs.

References

External links
 Oglala National Grassland - Nebraska National Forests and Grasslands
 Wildlife Viewing Area: Oglala National Grassland

Protected areas of Dawes County, Nebraska
National Grasslands of the United States
Protected areas of Sioux County, Nebraska
Grasslands of Nebraska
Federal lands in Nebraska